The MXR Phase 90 is a phaser effects pedal introduced in 1972 by MXR.

History
The Phase 90 was the first pedal sold by MXR and helped launch the company in 1974. The original model had a simple orange enclosure with a script style MXR logo. In 1977 MXR changed its logo to a block style.  There was a transitional period in which some Phase 90s with script logos had box logo circuits, and vice versa. Production ceased when MXR went bankrupt in 1984.

When Jim Dunlop bought the MXR brand, production resumed. The Dunlop models have an LED to indicate the effect is engaged, and an optional AC power supply. There are several styles, including the standard block logo version, a reproduction of the script logo version, and an Eddie Van Halen signature model. Van Halen first heard  Robin Trower use the pedal in the mid-1970s, and used it on songs such as "Eruption", "Atomic Punk", "Ain't Talkin' 'bout Love", "Everybody Wants Some!!", and "Drop Dead Legs". The 1974 Hand Wired Phase 90 is a recreation of an original 1974 pedal using new old stock (NOS) electronic components.

Description
The Phase 90 has an orange enclosure with a single control knob:

 Speed - varies the speed of the phasing effect.

The earliest "block" variants differ from the "script" variants in that they have a more pronounced sound (caused by the addition of a 24 kΩ feedback resistor) and the maximum speed is slightly higher (caused by the replacement of a 10 kΩ resistor in the effect's low-frequency oscillator with a 4.7 kΩ one); some later vintage units also have emphasis and de-emphasis circuits.

References

Effects units